Matrix is a Canadian fantasy adventure series that ran for 13 episodes in 1993. The series was broadcast by CTV in Canada, and the USA Network in the United States. The series was rebroadcast in 2000.

Synopsis 
The series starred Nick Mancuso as Steven Matrix, a hitman who is killed during a job and sent to a version of Purgatory called The City In-Between. There he is given a choice: to be sent to Hell for all the murders he's committed, or return to Earth and help people. Once alive again, Matrix receives periodic assignments from The City In-Between.

Cast 
 Phillip JarrettBilly Hicks
 Carrie-Anne MossLiz Teel
 John VernonNarrator

Production 
The central premise of this series may be derived from "Sea of Fire", an episode of the TV series The Equalizer. In that episode, Robert McCall (Edward Woodward's character) attempts to scare a street gang into going straight by taking them to a morgue. There, McCall introduces the gang to one of his friends, a former hit man, who relates a dream he had of standing beside a sea of fire, surrounded by all the people he ever killed.

Episode list

Rebroadcast 
In 1999, Carrie-Anne Moss starred in The Matrix, which had no relationship to the television series apart from its title and Moss' involvement. As a result, Matrix was made available for syndication in Canada and the United States.

References

External links 
 
 

1990s Canadian drama television series
1993 Canadian television series debuts
1993 Canadian television series endings
Fiction about purgatory